The 2009 Critérium du Dauphiné Libéré was the 61st edition of the Critérium du Dauphiné Libéré stage race. It took place from 7 June to 14 June, and was part of both the 2009 UCI ProTour and the inaugural World Calendar. It began in Nancy, France with an individual time trial, and ended in Grenoble. It began with a time trial, two flat stages and another time trial, and ended with four consecutive mountain stages.

Teams
As the Dauphiné Libéré is a UCI ProTour event, the 18 ProTour teams are invited automatically.

The 19 teams invited to the race are:

Route

Stages

Stage 1
7 June 2009 – Nancy,  (ITT)

The course for the opening individual time trial was mostly flat, with the category four Côte du Haut-du-Lièvre coming after .  Three of the favourites for the final classification took the podium places, benefiting from improving weather after Iván Gutiérrez had held the lead for nearly an hour.

Stage 2
8 June 2009 – Nancy to Dijon, 

This was the longest stage of the 2009 Dauphiné, and its profile is mostly flat. It saw very gentle undulation until the fairly steep descent from the category four Côte de Montcharvot,  from the finish. There was one other fourth-category climb on the stage.  A group of five riders held an advantage over the peloton that reached more than six minutes, but they were caught in the last . David Millar attempted a late escape, but he was overhauled by the sprinters, including stage winner Angelo Furlan.

Stage 3
9 June 2009 – Tournus to Saint-Étienne, 

A group of five riders escaped after , and were able to stay more than a minute and a half clear of the main group to the finish. Niki Terpstra won in a sprint finish over his fellow escapees, and took the yellow leader's jersey from Cadel Evans.

Stage 4
10 June 2009 – Bourg-lès-Valence to Valence,  (ITT)

The second individual time trial is very similar to the first in profile, featuring only a single fourth-category climb. Bert Grabsch, the current time trial world champion, won the stage. Cadel Evans won the yellow jersey back beating last stage's yellow jersey winner Niki Terpstra, who fell and finished on a replacement bike, by over 5 minutes.

Stage 5
11 June 2009 – Valence to Mont Ventoux, 

The first of the 2009 Dauphiné's four straight mountain stages sees the peloton ascend to the peak colloquially known as "Mount Baldy", some six weeks before the mountain hosts a critical stage finish in the 2009 Tour de France. There are three fourth-category climbs and a third-category climb on course, while the finish itself to Mont Ventoux is an Hors Categorie, or outside categorization climb. Sylwester Szmyd and Alejandro Valverde managed to break away on the ascent of Mount Ventoux, and worked to gain over a minute lead to Haimar Zubeldia. Szmyd took the stage win, while Valverde took the yellow jersey from Cadel Evans, who finished just over 2 minutes behind. After the stage, Ivan Basso dropped out.

Stage 6
12 June 2009 – Gap to Briançon, 

This short stage features another outside categorization climb, the Col d'Izoard, which is visited  before the finish line. The fourth-category Côte du Châteauroux-les-Alpes is visited earlier on in the stage, and the finish into Briançon is also a categorized climb. Fourteen men formed a breakaway early in the stage, and Pierrick Fédrigo, Jurgen Van de Walle, Stéphane Goubert and Juan Manuel Gárate broke free of the lead group on the ascent on Col d'Izoard. Fédrigo won the stage, and Alejandro Valverde finished together with Cadel Evans, defending the yellow jersey.

Stage 7
13 June 2009 – Briançon to Saint-François-Longchamp, 

This is the queen stage of the 2009 Dauphiné Libéré, with two outside categorization climbs on course and a first-category climb to the finish in Saint-François-Longchamp.

Stage 8
14 June 2009 – Faverges to Grenoble, 

This is branded as a mountain stage, but it is significantly less imposing than the previous three stages. There are two third-category climbs within the first  of the stage, along with the first-category Montée de Saint-Bernard-du-Touvet coming  from the finish.

Classification leadership progress table

Results

Notes

References

External links
 

2009 in French sport
2009 UCI ProTour
2009
2009 UCI World Ranking
June 2009 sports events in France